The Alaska Mountain Wilderness Classic (sometimes called the Alaska Wilderness Classic) is an adventure challenge that espouses purity of style and zero impact. Traditionally, the same route has been used for three years in a row, with each year being a different month (June, July, or August).

The rules are simple: start to finish with no outside support, requiring that participants carry all food and equipment; human-powered; leave no trace; and rescue is up to the individual to resolve. The most common form of transportation is by foot and packraft, although bicycles, skis, and paragliders have been used by intrepid participants. Beginning in 2004, participants have been required to carry satellite phones or Satellite emergency notification device like the DeLorme inReach to facilitate emergency rescues.

The organization of the challenge is grass-roots, having no affiliation to any organization or group, while generally fewer than 30 people enter in any one year. The Classic is often perceived as a race, but most certainly not a race.  It has had an influence on American adventure racing, backcountry use of the packraft, and ultralight hiking is significant. In addition to the summer challenge, there is an even more low-key unaffiliated winter event, the Alaska Mountain Wilderness Ski Classic, which has taken place annually since 1987 with travel through the Chugach Mountains, Alaska Range, Brooks Range, and Wrangell-St. Elias.

Routes and Challengers

1982–1984
Hope to Homer (Kenai Peninsula), 
 1982 – Roman Dial
 1983 – Roman Dial and Jim Lokken
 1984 – David Manzer (course record: 3 days 12 hours)

1985–1987
Mentasta to Denali National Park (Alaska Range), 
 1985 – Hank Timm
 1986 – Hank Timm
 1987 – Hank Timm and Randy Pitney (course record: 4 days 18 hours 27 minutes)

1988–1990
Nabesna to McCarthy (Wrangell – Saint Elias Wilderness), 
 1988 – Roman Dial
 1989 – David Manzer, Adrian Crane and Tom Possert
 1990 – Brant McGee and Jeff Gedney

1991–1993
Gates of the Arctic Wilderness (Brooks Range), 
 1991 – Brant McGee and Adrian Crane (course record: 2 days 6 hours 18 minutes)
 1992 – Brant McGee and Dave Dixon
 1993 – Gordy Vernon

1994–1996
Donnelly to McKinley Village (Alaska Range), 
 1994 – Frazier Miller
 1995 – Clark Saunders (course record: 2 days 12 hours 20 minutes)
 1996 – Steve Reifenstuhl and Rocky Reifenstuhl

1997–1999
Hope to Homer (Kenai Peninsula), 
 1997 – Gordy Vernon and Thai Verzone
 1998 – Gordy Vernon
 1999 – Jim Jaegar and Laura McDonough

2000–2002
Nabesna to McCarthy (Wrangell – Saint Elias Wilderness), 
 2000 – Steve Reifenstuhl and Rocky Reifenstuhl
 2001 – Steve Reifenstuhl and Rocky Reifenstuhl
 2002 – Roman Dial (course record: 2 days 4 hours 24 minutes)

2003–2005
Eureka to Talkeetna (Talkeetna Mountains), 
 2003 – Hans Neidig, Chris Robertson and Paul Hanis
 2004 – Gordy Vernon and Thai Verzone
 2005 – Robert Schnell, Jason Geck, Tyler Johnson and Rory Stark (course record: 1 day 23 hours 29 minutes)

2006–2008
Chicken to Central (Tanana-Yukon Uplands), 
 2006 – Robert Schnell and Chris Robertson (course record: 4 days 10 hours 42 minutes)
 2007 – Robert Schnell and Chris Robertson
 2008 – Butch Allen, Jim McDonough, Tyler Johnson and Craig "Chunk" Barnard

2009–2011
Gerstle River/Donnelly to McKinley Village (Alaska Range), 
 2009 – Robert Schnell, Chris Robertson and Andrew Skurka (course record: 3 days 17 hours 54 minutes)
 2010 – Robert Schnell, Chris Robertson, Todd Kasteler and Danny Powers
 2011 – Tyler Johnson, Todd Kasteler, Luc Mehl and John Sykes

2012–2014
Thompson Pass to Lakina River Bridge (Chugach Mountains, Wrangell – Saint Elias Wilderness),  -  
 2012 – Luc Mehl, Josh Mumm (3d 22.5h, Bremner Route)
 2013 – Lee Helzer, Steve Duby, Len Jenkins (Slowest first completion: 7 days, 8 hours, 44 minutes)
 2014 – Gerard Ganey, Todd Tumolo (course record: 3d 10h, Ice Route)

2015
Peters Hills to Red Shirt Lake via Rohn (Western Alaska Range, Susitna Valley), 
 2015 - Josh Mumm (course record: 5 days, 21 hours, 40 minutes)

2016–2018
Galbraith Lake to Wiseman (Brooks Range), 
 2016 - Todd Tumolo and Luc Mehl (course & challenge record: 1 day, 10 hours)
 2017 - Tobias Schwoerer and Harlow Robinson
 2018 - Tom Moran and Jay Cable

2019–2021
Cantwell to Sheep Mountain (Talkeetna Mountains), 
 2019 - Tobias Schwoerer and Jeremy Vandermeer
 2020 - Sam Hooper
 2021 - Nick Treinen (course record: 3 days, 10 hours)

2022–2024
Little Tok River to McCarthy, Alaska (Wrangell–St. Elias), 
 2022- Nick Treinen and Michael Versteeg  (June, course record: 4 days, 13 hours)
 2023 -
 2024 -

Challenge Historic Documentation
 Most entrants: 1984 Hope to Homer
 Lowest Completion:Entrants Ratio: 1:7.5 -- 2015 Peters Hills to Red Shirt Lake via Rohn (26 scratched)
 Highest Completion:Entrants Ratio: 1:1 -- 1995 Donnelly to McKinley Village (everybody finished)
 Fastest Completion: Todd Tumolo and Luc Mehl -- 2016 :1 day, 10 hours 
 Slowest Top Completion: Lee Helzer, Steve Duby, Len Jenkins: 7 days, 8 hours, 44 minutes -- 2013 Thompson Pass to Lakina River Bridge
 Fastest Solo Completion: Bjorn Flora: 2 days, 1 hour, 20 minutes -- 2005 Eureka to Talkeetna
 Fastest Female Completion: Lindsay Cameron and Ellen Martin: 2 days, 9 hours, 3 minutes -- 2017 Galbraith to Wiseman
 Oldest Completion: Dick Griffith -- 81 years old -- 2008 Chicken to Central
 Youngest Completion: Eric Cramer: 17 years one month old -- 1992 Gates of the  Arctic; Leo Hicker: 17 years old -- 2018 Galbraith to Wiseman
 Most Completions: John Lapkass: 20
 First use of a packraft: Dick Griffith -- 1982 Hope to Homer
 First use of a packraft and skis: Roman Dial and Jim Lokken -- 1983 Hope to Homer 
 First use of a mountain bike: Hank Timm and Randy Pitney -- 1987 Mentasta to McKinley
 First use of a paraglider: Chuck Comstock -- 1988 Nabesna to McCarthy

References

 Alaska Mountain Wilderness Classic Race reports
 "Across the Talkeetna Mountains"
 2004 Alaska Mountain Wilderness Classic
 Wilderness Classic Blog and Information
 Video of the 2009 race by Roman Dial
 2009 Race Report by Andrew Skurka

1982 establishments in Alaska
Annual events in Alaska
Recurring sporting events established in 1982
Sports competitions in Alaska